Vojtěch Engelmann (born 4 July 1989) is a professional Czech football player who last played for Manningham United FC

Engelmann arrived at Dukla in January 2012 from third division side TJ Kunice. He made his Czech First League debut at the age of 22 on 17 February 2012 in a match against Viktoria Žižkov. He went to Baník Ostrava on loan during the summer of 2013, scoring four times for Baník before returning to Dukla in December of the same year. He went out on loan to Bohemians 1905 in the summer of 2014 on a year-long deal. Engelmann joined Baník Ostrava on loan for the second time in August 2015. He currently plays for Manningham United FC in the Victorian State League Division 1. In his first season, he played 13 of the 22 games and scored 11 goals which made him the top goalscorer for Manningham in the 2016 season. He also scored two goals in the FFA Cup against Sydenham park which makes him Manningham's record goalscorer in that competition.

References

External links

Czech footballers
1989 births
Living people
Czech First League players
FK Dukla Prague players
FC Baník Ostrava players
Bohemians 1905 players
Association football forwards
FK Kunice players